Emirati Arabic refers to a group of Arabic dialectal varieties spoken by the Emiratis native to the United Arabic Emirates that share core characteristics with specific phonological, lexical, and morphosyntactic features and a certain degree of intra-dialectal variation, which is mostly geographically defined. It incorporates grammatical properties of smaller varieties within the UAE, generally of tribal nature, which can be roughly divided into a couple of broader sub-varieties: the first spoken in the Northern Emirates of Dubai, Sharjah, Ajman, Umm al-Quwain, and the western part of Ras al-Khaimah; the second in the eastern part of the country, mainly in Fujeirah, Dibba, Khor Fakkan, Hatta, Kalba, and the eastern part of Ras al-Khaimah; the third in Abu Dhabi including the oasis city of Al Ain, the dialect is also seen in the Omani region of Al-Buraimi; and the fourth is the Shihhi dialect spoken in the emirate of Ras Al Khaimah which is also spoken in the Omani exclave of Musandam.

Speakers of Emirati Arabic identify themselves as speakers of a distinct variety (as compared with neighbouring dialects such as Qatari or Kuwaiti Arabic), based on several phonological, morphological, and synactic properties that distinguish Emirati Arabic from other Gulf Arabic varieties.

Arabic language
There are different forms of Arabic:

 Classical Arabic, the language of the Quran and of all the literature of the first centuries of Hijrah (from 622 AD)
 Modern Standard Arabic (the fuṣḥah, in Arabic: فصحى), the contemporary standard language taught in schools and used in journalistic prose, in written administrative texts, in mass media and in universities.
 Colloquial Arabic, the set of dialects used in everyday communication, outside the written and formal situations that varies not only from one Arabic country to another but also from one region to another within the individual states.

Diglossia and dialectal variety
Due to the coexistence of the Modern Standard Arabic (high language) and the dialect (low language), it is possible to speak about diglossia of the Arabic language.

The United Arab Emirates, extending over a total area of about 83,000 km² and hosting more than 200 different nationalities, represent one of the nations with the largest aggregation of ethnic groups in the world. Archaeological excavations have shown that in this area several Semitic races were established. It follows that the spoken language, the Emirate dialect, includes some different dialectal shades. It represents the communication tool used by the overwhelming majority of the population, although people of good cultural level are able to express themselves in official Arabic. Notwithstanding the recent filling up of urban areas to the detriment of rural ones has led to a growing decrease in local dialectal variations, we can still identify three main areas of different shades of the Emirate dialect: Abu Dhabi (including Al-'Ayn, the western region and islands), the Northern Emirates (including Dubai, Sharjah, Ajman, Umm al-Quwain and part of Ras al-Khaimah) and the East Coast (including Fujairah, Khawr Fakkan, and the remainder of Ras al-Khaimah). To give a practical example, the word "mob (مب)" a negation which simply translates to "Not" should be mentioned with its variations: "mesh (مش)" in Abu Dhabi, "mob (مب)" in the Northern Emirates and "ma (ما)" in the East Coast.

Furthermore, the unification of the United Arab Emirates has contributed to making changes to the locally spoken dialect. Due to the Emirates' aggressive globalisation, it has been necessary to identify a more standard method of communication to interact with foreigners. As a result, the Emirati dialect has received influences from other Arabic dialects and foreign languages. Words from the technical language have often an English origin and have arrived in the Persian Gulf through interchanges with the English and Indian population, and then have been adapted to an Arabic pronunciation.

Moreover, in the spoken Emirati language it is common to substitute some letters with others of similar sound: the "j" can become "y"; the "k" can become "ch"; the "q" can become "g" or "j".

There is also a guide book for the Arabic dialect of the Emirates, Spoken Emirati, and an Italian version, Dialetto Emiratino, edited by Nico de Corato together with Hanan Al Fardan and Abdulla Al Kaabi, authors of the original English version.

Loanwords 
Some examples of loanwords in Emirati Arabic:

- soman 'equipment' from Urdu.

- dreywal 'driver' from English.

- seedah '''front' from Urdu.

- khashoogah 'spoon' from Persian.

- dareesha 'window' from Persian.

- bushkar 'servant' from Persian.

- acancel 'I cancel' from English.

- dowshag  'mattress' from Persian.

- lait 'light' from English.

- orradi 'already' from English.

- sandiweech 'sandwich' from English.

- jooty 'shoe' from Persian.

- saycal 'bicycle' from English.

- kahb 'cap' from English.

- burwaz 'frame' from Turkish.

- chup 'shut up' from Urdu.

- motahr 'car/motor' from English.

- dekaan 'store' from Persian.

- daftar 'notebook' from Persian.

- serwaal 'trousers' from Persian.

- estaath 'teacher' from Persian.

- modha 'fashion' from French.

- regime 'diet' from French.

- banteloon 'trousers' from French.

- rubiyya 'money' from Hindi.

- shanta'' 'bag' from Turkish.

- abla 'teacher' from Turkish.

- tezz 'whatever' from Turkish.

References

External links
 Emirati Dialect Conversation Manual (in Italian)

Dialect
Arabic language
Gulf Arabic
United Arab Emirates